Sanjiang is a town and the seat of Jinping County, in southeastern Guizhou province, China, located in the northeast of the county along the Qingshui River. , it has four residential communities and 20 villages under its administration.

References

Towns in Guizhou